The katablepharids, a group of heterotrophic flagellates, have been considered as part of the Cryptista since katablepharids were described in 1939. Although they differ from other cryptophytes and have even been proposed to be alveolates, early 21st century research suggests they are related to cryptophytes.

Phylogeny
As of 2009, only five genera and ten species have been formally described. Dozens of other DNA sequences (both freshwater and marine) seem to represent further katablepharids which have not been cultured or formally described.

Classification
Based on studies done by Cavalier-Smith, Chao & Lewis 2015
 Super Class Leucocrypta Cavalier-Smith 2015 stat. n. [Kathablepharidophyta (sic)Okamoto & Inouye 2005]
 Class Leucocryptea Cavalier-Smith 2004 [Kathablepharidea (sic) Okamoto & Inouye 2005; Kathablepharidophyceae (sic) Okamoto & Inouye 2005]
 Order Katablepharida Cavalier-Smith 1993 [Kathablepharida (sic)]
 Family Katablepharidae Vors 1992 [Kathablepharidae (sic)]
 Genus Roombia Okamoto et al. 2009
 Genus Leucocryptos Butcher 1967
 Genus Platychilomonas Larsen & Patterson 1990
 Genus Hatena Okamoto & Inouye 2006
 Genus Katablepharis Skuja 1939

References

External links
 Tree of Life: Katablepharids

Cryptista
Katablepharida